The Miette Group is an assemblage of metamorphosed sedimentary rocks of latest Precambrian (Neoproterozoic) age. It is present in the Canadian Cordillera from the Lake Louise area of Alberta to the Yukon. The Miette rocks include Ediacaran fossils, stromatolites, and trace fossils.

See also

 List of fossiliferous stratigraphic units in British Columbia

References

References
 

Geologic groups of North America
Geologic formations of Canada
Western Canadian Sedimentary Basin
Stratigraphy of British Columbia
Ediacaran British Columbia
Stratigraphy of Alberta